Weinmannia ulei is a species of plant in the family Cunoniaceae. It is endemic to Peru.

References

Endemic flora of Peru
ulei
Vulnerable plants
Taxonomy articles created by Polbot
Taxobox binomials not recognized by IUCN